Juntos Para Siempre may refer to:
 Juntos Para Siempre (Los Mismos album), 1995
 Juntos Para Siempre (Bebo Valdés and Chucho Valdés album), 2009